Ezz or EZZ may refer to:

Ezz Steel, the largest steel company in Egypt and the Middle East and North Africa Region
Ahmed Ezz (disambiguation), various people
Ezz Eddin Hosni (1927–2013), an Egyptian musician and composer
EZZ, FAA identifier for Cameron Memorial Airport, a public use airport in Clinton County, Missouri